The Solar Anus is a short surrealist text by the French writer Georges Bataille, written in 1927 and published with drawings by André Masson in 1931.

Albeit elliptically, its aphorisms refer to decay, death, vegetation, natural disasters, impotence, frustration, ennui and excrement. It makes ironic reference to the sun, which, although it brings life to the Earth, can also result in death from its unrestrained energies. Moreover, the anus may be seen as a symbol of the inevitability of residual waste due to its role in excretion.

References

External links
The Solar Anus at theanarchistlibrary.org

1931 books
Works by Georges Bataille
Nihilist works
Fiction about alchemy
Surrealist works
Sun in culture